The Los Angeles Aviators are a professional Ultimate team that competes in the West Division of the American Ultimate Disc League (AUDL). The Aviators played their first season in 2015.

History
The American Ultimate Disc League formally announced the Aviators as an expansion team in October 2014, to compete in the West Division for the 2015 season. During the ensuing offseason, the Aviators signed much of the LA talent pool, as well as luring some players from the San Jose Spiders.

The Aviators earned their first AUDL playoff berth in 2016, and advanced again the following season. In 2018, the Aviators advanced to AUDL Championship Weekend.

References

2015 establishments in California
Ultimate teams established in 2015
Ultimate (sport) teams
Sports in Los Angeles